Martin Burckhardt (born 28 July 1957 in Fulda) is a German author and cultural theorist.

Career 
As a young author he was engaged in the field of audio art, creating and producing experimental audio pieces, often in cooperation with composer and musician Johannes Schmoelling. Parallel to his artistic work his first theoretical sketches unfolded. As a consequence of his first book (The Metamorphoses of Time and Space) he started teaching at various universities, at Humboldt University, then at Free University Berlin. From 1997 to 2000 he worked as a curator for the Government of Hamburg, organizing Interface V, a symposium and exhibition of computer culture. On 4 November 1995, he and his brother, Wolfram Burckhardt, founded the cultural publishing house Kulturverlag Kadmos.

From 2000, Burckhardt delved into the field of programming and Game design, an interest that found its resonance in an installation in the USER–exhibition of Center for Art and Media Karlsruhe. In 2011 he created the online game TwinKomplex, which interweaves film, literary narrative, photography, design and game to form a new genre of transmedia storytelling.

After 2013, Burckhardt concentrated on writing. In 2014, he published the science fiction novel Score, which depicts a society that solely relies on a gamified economy, followed a year later by a meditation on the Boolean formula. In 2017, his book on the Philosophy of the Machine appeared.

Burckhardt is a regular contributor for intellectual magazines like Lettre International and Merkur. For the German newspaper Frankfurter Allgemeine Zeitung he writes a series on the history of the computer, portraying outstanding computer pioneers.

Burckhardt's work has been translated into Dutch, Spanish, Portuguese, Korean, English and Chinese. His book All and Nothing. A Digital Apocalypse is published by MIT Press.

Works

Books 
 Metamorphosen von Raum und Zeit. Eine Geschichte der Wahrnehmung. Campus, Frankfurt/M. 1994, .
 Vom Geist der Maschine. Eine Geschichte der kultureller Umbrüche. Campus, Frankfurt/M. 1999, .
 Brandlhuber. Eine Fiktion. König, Köln 2005, .
 Die Scham der Philosophen. Semele, Berlin 2006, .
 68. Die Geschichte einer Kulturrevolution. Semele, Berlin 2007, .
 Eine kleine Geschichte der großen Gedanken. Wie die Philosophie die Welt erfand. DuMont, Köln 2008, .
 Digitale Renaissance. Manifest für eine neue Welt. Metrolit, Berlin 2014, . Website zum Buch
 Wie die Philosophie unsere Welt erfand. DuMont, Köln 2014, .
 Alles und Nichts. Ein Pandämonium digitaler Weltvernichtung. (with Dirk Höfer) Matthes & Seitz, Berlin 2015, . Website zum Buch
 Score. Wir schaffen das Paradies auf Erden. Roman. Knaus, München 2015, . 
 Todo y nada. Un pandemonio de la destrucción del mundo. Herder editorial, Barcelona 2017.
 Philosophie der Maschine. Matthes & Seitz, Berlin 2017, .
 All and Nothing. A digital Apocalypse (with Dirk Höfer). MIT Press, 2017,

Selected Articles & Essays 

 1988. Digital Metaphysics. Merkur (Vol. 42) 4/1988
 1988. The Universal Machine. Merkur (Vol. 44) 11/1990

References

External links 
 Author's homepage
 Author's Substack Blog Ex nihilo

Living people
1957 births
People from Fulda
German male novelists
20th-century German non-fiction writers
21st-century German writers
20th-century German male writers
German male non-fiction writers